E. C. Smith may refer to:
 E. C. Smith (Green Lake County) (born 1852), American farmer, sheriff, and politician
 E. C. Smith (Rock County), American politician